The Caudron C.190 was a French two-seat low-wing single-engine sports plane, built by the French aeroplane manufacturer Caudron in the late 1920s. The only variant of the C.190 family (C.190/191/192/193) to be built in series was the C.193.

Operational history
Information in publications is vague, but at least six C.193s were produced (reg. F-AJHG, F-AJOB, F-AJSG, F-AJSH, F-AJSI, F-AJSJ) and one Salmson-powered C.192 (F-AJHF). One aircraft, C.193 F-AJSI, was sold to Great Britain in 1930 and registered as G-ABFX, but returned to France in 1931 to be registered as F-ALLJ.

In 1929, aircraft F-AJHF and F-AJHG participated in the Challenge 1929 international touring plane contest, and one of them completed it in 28th place, flown by Raymond Delmotte

In 1930, three C.193s participated in the Challenge 1930 international touring plane contest (F-AJSG, F-AJSH, F-AJSI), Maurice Finat completing it in 17th place and François Arrachart in 24th place.

Variants

 C.190 - first variant, with 80 hp (58.8 kW) Renault straight engine
 C.191 - variant with 95 hp (69.8 kW) Salmson 7AC radial engine
 C.192 - variant with 95 hp (69.8 kW) Salmson 7AC radial engine
 C.193 - series variant, with 98 hp (72 kW) Renault 4Pb straight engine

Specifications (C.193)

References

Bibliography

 Marian Krzyżan: Międzynarodowe turnieje lotnicze 1929-1934, Warsaw 1988,

External links

Caudron C.193 at Aviafrance.com

1920s French sport aircraft
C.190
Low-wing aircraft
Single-engined tractor aircraft
Aircraft first flown in 1929